Taurine, or 2-aminoethanesulfonic acid, is a non-proteinogenic amino sulfonic acid that is widely-distributed  in animal tissues. It is a major constituent of bile and can be found in the large intestine, and accounts for up to 0.1% of total human body weight. It is named after Latin  (cognate to Ancient Greek ταῦρος, taûros) meaning bull or ox, as it was first isolated from ox bile in 1827 by German scientists Friedrich Tiedemann and Leopold Gmelin. It was discovered in human bile in 1846 by Edmund Ronalds.

It has many biological roles, such as conjugation of bile acids, antioxidation, osmoregulation, membrane stabilization, and modulation of calcium signaling. It is essential for cardiovascular function, and development and function of skeletal muscle, the retina, and the central nervous system.

Taurine concentrations in land plants are very low or undetectable, but up to 1000 nmol/g wet weight have been found in algae.

It is an unusual example of a naturally occurring sulfonic acid.

Chemical and biochemical features
Taurine exists as a zwitterion , as verified by X-ray crystallography. The sulfonic acid has a low pKa ensuring that it is fully ionized to the sulfonate at the pHs found in the intestinal tract.

Synthesis
Synthetic taurine is obtained by the ammonolysis of isethionic acid (2-hydroxyethanesulfonic acid), which in turn is obtained from the reaction of ethylene oxide with aqueous sodium bisulfite. A direct approach involves the reaction of aziridine with sulfurous acid.

In 1993, about 5,000–6,000 tonnes of taurine were produced for commercial purposes: 50% for pet food and 50% in pharmaceutical applications. As of 2010, China alone has more than 40 manufacturers of taurine. Most of these enterprises employ the ethanolamine method to produce a total annual production of about 3,000 tonnes.

In the laboratory, taurine can be produced by alkylation of ammonia with bromoethanesulfonate salts.

Biosynthesis
Taurine is naturally derived from cysteine. Mammalian taurine synthesis occurs in the pancreas via the cysteine sulfinic acid pathway. In this pathway, cysteine is first oxidized to its sulfinic acid, catalyzed by the enzyme cysteine dioxygenase. Cysteine sulfinic acid, in turn, is decarboxylated by sulfinoalanine decarboxylase to form hypotaurine. Hypotaurine is enzymatically oxidized to yield taurine by hypotaurine dehydrogenase.

Taurine is also produced by the transsulfuration pathway, which converts homocysteine into cystathionine. The cystathionine is then converted to hypotaurine by the sequential action of three enzymes: cystathionine gamma-lyase, cysteine dioxygenase, and cysteine sulfinic acid decarboxylase. Hypotaurine is then oxidized to taurine as described above.

A pathway for taurine biosynthesis from serine and sulfate is reported in microalgae, developing chicken embryos, and chick liver.  Serine dehydratase converts serine to 2-aminoacrylate, which is converted to cysteic acid by 3′-phosphoadenylyl sulfate:2-aminoacrylate C-sulfotransferase. Cysteic acid is converted to taurine by cysteine sulfinic acid decarboxylase.

Nutritional significance
Taurine occurs naturally in fish and meat. The mean daily intake from omnivore diets was determined to be around 58 mg (range from 9 to 372 mg) and to be low or negligible from a strict vegan diet. In another study, taurine intake was estimated to be generally less than 200 mg/day, even in individuals eating a high-meat diet. According to a third study, taurine consumption was estimated to vary between 40 and 400 mg/day.

The availability of taurine is affected depending on how the food is prepared, raw diets retaining the most taurine, and baking or boiling resulting in the greatest taurine loss.

Taurine levels were found to be significantly lower in vegans than in a control group on a standard American diet. Plasma taurine was 78% of control values, and urinary taurine was 29%.

Prematurely born infants are believed to lack the enzymes needed to convert cystathionine to cysteine, and may, therefore, become deficient in taurine. Taurine is present in breast milk, and has been added to many infant formulas, as a measure of prudence, since the early 1980s. However, this practice has never been rigorously studied, and as such it has yet to be proven to be necessary, or even beneficial.

Energy drinks and workout supplements
Taurine is an ingredient in some energy drinks. Many contain 1000 mg per serving, and some as much as 2000 mg.

It is also found in various dietary supplements aimed towards athletes.

Physiological functions

Human physiology and nutrition

Taurine is essential for cardiovascular function and development and function of skeletal muscle, the retina, and the central nervous system. It is a biosynthetic precursor to the bile salts sodium taurochenodeoxycholate and sodium taurocholate. Taurine is necessary for normal skeletal muscle functioning. On the cellular level, taurine acts as an osmolyte that regulates cell volume. It also helps modulate intracellular free calcium concentrations. 

Taurine functions as an antioxidant, suppressing the toxicity of hypochlorite and hypobromite produced physiologically. Taurine reacts with these halogenating agents to form N-chloro- and N-bromotaurine, which are less toxic than their precursors hypohalides.  Taurine has multiple effects on fat anabolism and catabolism, including inhibition of expression of HMG-CoA reductase, suppression of secretion of apolipoprotein B100, upregulation of expression of CYP7A1, and upregulation of expression of LDL receptor.

Taurine crosses the blood–brain barrier and has been implicated in a wide array of physiological phenomena including inhibitory neurotransmission, membrane stabilization feedback inhibition of neutrophil/macrophage respiratory burst, adipose tissue regulation and calcium homeostasis, recovery from osmotic shock, protection against glutamate excitotoxicity, and prevention of epileptic seizures.

Taurine acts as a glycation inhibitor. Taurine-treated diabetic rats had a decrease in the formation of advanced glycation end products (AGEs) and AGEs content. The United States Department of Agriculture has found a link between cataract development and lower levels of vitamin B6, folate, and taurine in the diets of the elderly.

A 2022 systematic review of literature found that across 5 relevant studies, taurine supplementation reduced levels of HbA1c, fasting blood sugar level, and HOMA-IR. The study recommended further trials to guide clinical practice. There is evidence that taurine may exert a beneficial effect in preventing diabetes-associated microangiopathy and tubulointerstitial injury in diabetic nephropathy.

Animal physiology and nutrition

According studies on rats, taurine produces an anxiolytic effect and may act as a modulator or antianxiety agent in the central nervous system by activating the glycine receptor.

In diabetic rats, taurine supplementation slightly reduced abdominal body fat while improving glucose tolerance. Taurine is effective in removing fatty liver deposits in rats, preventing liver disease, and reducing cirrhosis in tested animals. Likewise, taurine administration to diabetic rabbits resulted in 30% decrease in serum glucose levels.

Mice with a genetic taurine deficiency had a nearly complete depletion of skeletal and cardiac muscle taurine levels and a reduction of more than 80% of exercise capacity compared to control mice. Taurine can influence defects in nerve blood flow, motor nerve conduction velocity, and nerve sensory thresholds in experimental diabetic neuropathic rats.

Cats lack the enzymatic machinery (sulfinoalanine decarboxylase) to produce taurine and must therefore acquire it from their diet. A taurine deficiency in cats can lead to retinal degeneration and eventually blindness – a condition known as central retinal degeneration (CRD), as well as hair loss and tooth decay. Other effects of a diet lacking in this essential amino acid are dilated cardiomyopathy and reproductive failure in females. Decreased plasma taurine concentration has been demonstrated to be associated with feline dilated cardiomyopathy. Unlike CRD, the condition is reversible with supplementation. Taurine is now a requirement of the Association of American Feed Control Officials (AAFCO) and any dry or wet food product labeled approved by the AAFCO should have a minimum of 0.1% taurine in dry food and 0.2% in wet food. Studies suggest the amino acid should be supplied at 10 mg/kg of bodyweight/day for domestic cats.

Taurine appears essential to the development of passerine birds. Many passerines seek out taurine-rich spiders to feed their young, particularly just after hatching. Researchers compared the behaviours and development of birds fed a taurine-supplemented diet to a control diet and found the juveniles fed taurine-rich diets as neonates were much larger risk takers and more adept at spatial learning tasks.

Taurine has been used in some cryopreservation mixes for animal artificial insemination.

In a study analyzing ocular tissue extracts of rat eyes, it was found that taurine was the most abundant amino acid present within the retina, vitreous humor, lens, cornea, iris, and ciliary body. Within the retina, taurine is necessary for the development of photoreceptors.

Safety and toxicity
A substantial increase in the plasma concentration of growth hormone was reported in some epileptic patients during taurine tolerance testing (oral dose of 50 mg per kg body mass per day), suggesting a potential to stimulate the hypothalamus and to modify neuroendocrine function. A 1966 study found an indication that taurine (2 g/day) has some function in the maintenance and possibly in the induction of psoriasis. Three later studies failed to support that finding.
It may also be necessary to take into consideration that absorption of taurine from beverages may be more rapid than from foods.

Taurine has an observed safe level of supplemental intake in normal healthy adults at up to 3 g/day. Even so, a study by the European Food Safety Authority found no adverse effects for up to 1,000 mg of taurine per kilogram of body weight per day.

A review published in 2008 found no documented reports of negative or positive health effects associated with the amount of taurine used in energy drinks, concluding, "The amounts of guarana, taurine, and ginseng found in popular energy drinks are far below the amounts expected to deliver either therapeutic benefits or adverse events".

Other uses

In cosmetics and contact lens solutions
Since the 2000s, cosmetic compositions containing taurine have been introduced, possibly due to its antifibrotic properties. It has been shown to prevent the damaging effects of TGFB1 to hair follicles. It also helps to maintain skin hydration.

Taurine is also used in some contact lens solutions.

Derivatives

Taurine is used in the preparation of the anthelmintic drug netobimin (Totabin).
Taurolidine
Taurocholic acid and tauroselcholic acid
Tauromustine
5-Taurinomethyluridine and 5-taurinomethyl-2-thiouridine are modified uridines in (human) mitochondrial tRNA.
Tauryl is the functional group attaching at the sulfur, 2-aminoethylsulfonyl.
Taurino is the functional group attaching at the nitrogen, 2-sulfoethylamino.

See also 
Homotaurine (tramiprosate), precursor to acamprosate
Taurates, a substance group.

References

External links 
Mass Spectrum of Taurine
Taurine bound to proteins in the PDB

Amines
Sulfonic acids
Glycine receptor agonists
Inhibitory amino acids